As If I Am Not There (Serbian: Као да ме нема, Kao da me nema) is a 2010 drama film made by Irish director Juanita Wilson. The film is set in the Balkans and is shot in the Serbo-Croatian language. It was selected as the Irish entry for the Best Foreign Language Film at the 84th Academy Awards, but did not make the final shortlist.

The film follows a young teacher who travels to a remote village. After the village is attacked, she is imprisoned and raped, together with the women of village. It is based on Slavenka Drakulić's 1999 novel of the same name that deals with war rape in the Bosnian War.

Plot 
Set during the Bosnian War, the movie follows the experiences of a young female teacher from Sarajevo who travels to a remote village to teach. Soon after arriving, the village is attacked by a group of soldiers. The men are killed, the women separated from the children, and placed in a makeshift brothel. There, the women are repeatedly raped and beaten.

The film is adapted from a novel by Croatian journalist Slavenka Drakulic based on testimony of women taken prisoner during the Bosnian War.

Cast
 Nataša Petrović as Samira
 Fedja Stukan as The Captain
 Jelena Jovanova as Jasmina
 Miraj Grbić as Commander
 Jasna Diklić
 Zvezda Angelovska
 Nikolina Kujaca
 Sanja Burić
 Katina Ivanova
 Jana Stojanovska
 Nino Levi
 Irina Apelgren as Alisa
 Jana Mircevska
 Stellan Skarsgård

Reception
The film received positive reviews. Review aggregation website Rotten Tomatoes gives the film a score of 85% based on 13 reviews, with an average rating of 6.4/10.

See also
 List of submissions to the 84th Academy Awards for Best Foreign Language Film
 List of Irish submissions for the Academy Award for Best Foreign Language Film

References

External links
 

2010 films
2010 drama films
2010 war drama films
Irish drama films
Serbo-Croatian-language films
Bosnian War films
Films based on Croatian novels
Films about rape
Films about Bosnian genocide
Yugoslav Wars in fiction